Couratari sandwithii is a species of woody plant in the family Lecythidaceae. It is found in Suriname and Venezuela.

References

sandwithii
Flora of Suriname
Flora of Venezuela
Vulnerable plants
Taxonomy articles created by Polbot